Robert F. Burford (February 5, 1923 – June 17, 1993) was an American politician who served in the Colorado House of Representatives from the 54th district from 1975 to 1981 and as the Director of the Bureau of Land Management from 1981 to 1989. He served as Speaker of the Colorado House of Representatives from 1979 to 1981. He is also stepfather to Neil Gorsuch, who now serves as associate justice of the Supreme Court.

References

1923 births
1993 deaths
Speakers of the Colorado House of Representatives
Republican Party members of the Colorado House of Representatives
Bureau of Land Management personnel
20th-century American politicians